Tarzan of the Apes is a novel by American writer Edgar Rice Burroughs

Tarzan of the Apes may also refer to:
 Tarzan of the Apes (1918 film), an American action/adventure silent film
 Tarzan of the Apes (1999 film), an animated musical adventure film

See also 
 Tarzan (disambiguation)
 Tarzan, the Ape Man (disambiguation)